This page lists board and card games, wargames, and miniatures games published in 1970.

Games released or invented in 1970

References

Games
Games by year